Acacia podalyriifolia is a perennial tree which is fast-growing and widely cultivated. It is native to Australia but is also naturalised in Malaysia, Africa, India and South America. Its uses include environmental management and it is also used as an ornamental tree. It is very closely related to Acacia uncifera. It blooms during winter.

Common names for it are Mount Morgan wattle, Queensland silver wattle, Queensland wattle, pearl acacia, pearl wattle and silver wattle.

Description
Like most species of Acacia it has phyllodes rather than true leaves. It has grey coloured, smooth or finely fissured bark with terete and hairy branchlets that are often covered with a fine white powdery coating.

Taxonomy
The species was first formally described by the botanist George Don in 1832 as part of the work General History of Dichlamydeous Plants. It was reclassified as Racosperma podalyriifolium by Leslie Pedley in 1987 then transferred back to genus Acacia in 2014. Other synonyms include Acacia podalyrifolia.

Distribution
In Australia it is endemic to parts of south eastern Queensland and the north east of New South Wales in areas to the north of Legume but has become naturalised further south where it is found in open woodland or forest communities. It has also become naturalised in Western Australia and South Australia.

Outside of Australia, it is naturalized in southern and eastern Africa, in some parts of the Indian sub-continent and south-east Asia, on some Indian Ocean islands, in New Zealand, in Brazil, in Argentina, and in southwestern USA. Overall, it thrives in subtropical and tropical conditions and tolerates semiarid climates.

As a weed 
Being fast to spread, it is considered an environmental weed in New South Wales, Victoria, Southern Australia, and Western Australia. It is relatively widespread in South Africa, where it is considered a "potential transformer" of natural vegetation due to the possibility of it replacing indigenous vegetation.

See also
List of Acacia species

References

podalyriifolia
Trees of Australia
Trees of Africa
Trees of South America
Fabales of Australia
Flora of New South Wales
Flora of Queensland
Garden plants of Australia